Marco Diaz or Marco Díaz may refer to:

People
 Marco Antonio Serna Díaz, herpetologist, ornithologist, and naturalist from Colombia
 Marco Vargas Diaz, Costa Rican economist and politician
 Marco Díaz, political candidate in the 2021 Chilean gubernatorial elections
 Marco Diaz Jr., record producer and DJ known as Infamous
 Marco Díaz, musician from the band Candela

Fictional characters
 Marco Diaz, a character in the animated television series Star vs. the Forces of Evil
 Marco Diaz, a character in the television series Bloodline

See also 
 Marco Diaz Ávalos, football manager for Coras de Nayarit F.C.
 Marcos Díaz (disambiguation)